Baťa Canal (in Czech Baťův kanál or Průplav Otrokovice-Rohatec) is a navigable canal on the Morava river in the Czech Republic. The water canal was built during 1934-38 and today it serves mainly for recreational cruises.

History
Reasons for building the canal were two: an attempt to increase the level of groundwater after the Morava river was regulated and as an initial phase of long planned but never realized Danube-Oder-Canal.

The immediate reason for the construction was the need to transfer lignite from mine in Ratíškovice to the Otrokovice power plant. Both were owned by Bata Shoes (Baťovy závody) and the company was the main investor (the rest was paid for by the state). Construction started on October 16, 1934 and finished during autumn 1938. The canal was financed by Jan Antonín Baťa in cooperation with the Czechoslovak state.

Technical details
The route is 51.8 km long, of which 27 km fall to the Morava river, 1 km to the Dřevnice river and 24 km is artificial canal. The difference in water levels is 18.6 m.

In total 33 bridges spanned over the canal.  The canal had 14 canal locks. Some parts of the technical infrastructure were quite unique at the time of construction.

Canal today
During World War II the canal was severely damaged and only partially repaired (repairs lasted until 1949). Its use for transportation declined and in 1972 it was officially abandoned.

In 1995 the route was reopened for sightseeing tours. After repairs 13 canal locks are now accessible. The canal became the most popular tourist destination of the region. It is also used for transportation of industrial goods and plans exist to extend it downstream to the border of Slovakia.

Literature
 Baťův kanál – od myšlenky k nápadu, collection of authors, Povodí Moravy, 2018, .

External links
  Canal website (cz, en)
 History of the canal (cz)
 Se of photos from the canal
 Another set of photos

Canals in the Czech Republic
Zlín District
Uherské Hradiště District
Hodonín District
Buildings and structures in the South Moravian Region
Buildings and structures in the Zlín Region
Canals opened in 1938